Lubieszyn  is a village in the administrative district of Gmina Liniewo, within Kościerzyna County, Pomeranian Voivodeship, in northern Poland.

For details of the history of the region, see History of Pomerania.

The village has a population of 253.

Notable residents
Kurt Möhring (3 January 1900 – 18 December 1944), Wehrmacht general

References

Lubieszyn